Gaslyn is an unincorporated community in the town of Rusk, Burnett County, Wisconsin, United States. Gaslyn is located along County Highway H to the south of Gaslyn Lake. The community is part of the reservation of the St. Croix Chippewa Indians of Wisconsin. The community was named for David C. Gaslin, a logger during the 1860s. A post office operated in the community from 1902 to 1919.

Notes

Unincorporated communities in Burnett County, Wisconsin
Unincorporated communities in Wisconsin